Tony Zarrindast ( also known as Mohammad Zarrindast) was an Iranian American film producer, film director and cinema actor. He was considered by some as the "Persian Ed Wood". His 1996 film Werewolf was featured on an episode of Mystery Science Theater 3000. Zarrindast graduated from University of California, Los Angeles in the field of cinema. His brother was Alireza Zarrindast. On November 29, 2016 he died from cancer.

Notes

External links
 
 Mohammad Zarrindast in Internet database of Soureh Cinema

Iranian male film actors
Iranian male stage actors
UCLA Film School alumni
Iranian male television actors
People from Tabriz
American people of Iranian-Azerbaijani descent
Iranian film directors
Iranian film producers
Iranian emigrants to the United States
1934 births
2016 deaths